Federico Pablo Cichero (born 9 October 1983) is a cross-country skier from Argentina. He competed for Argentina at the 2014 Winter Olympics in the 15 kilometre classical race and finished 83rd out of 92 competitors with a time of 49:11.3.

References

External links 
 
 
 
 

1983 births
Living people
Argentine male cross-country skiers
Cross-country skiers at the 2014 Winter Olympics
Olympic cross-country skiers of Argentina